The European Universities in Egypt (Arabic: الجامعات الأوروبية في مصر; Abbreviation: EUE) is a University Institution in the New Administrative Capital (Cairo Governorate) and was launched according to Law No. 162/2018 (the IBC law)  on the Establishment and Organization of International Branch Campuses (IBCs) within The Arab Republic of Egypt and University Institutions, the Minister of Higher Education and Scientific Research Decree No. 4200/2018 and the President’s Decree No. 86/2021.

The New Administrative Capital, the location of EUE, is part of a national agenda called Egypt Vision 2030 and includes a complete educational infrastructure, which adds schools and also new university institutions.  

EUE Founder is Mahmoud Hashem Abdel-Kader. The university institution currently hosts 

The University of London (UoL) as Awarding body with academic direction from its member institutions, among them LSE (The London School of Economics and Political Sciences), Goldsmiths, King's College London, and the Laws Consortium (that consists of 6 UoL Law Schools), 

 The University of Central Lancashire (UCLan). 

and therewith European studies and the respective European university degrees with programmes at the undergraduate, graduate and professional levels. EUE opened in fall 2021. Current study programmes include Economics, Management, Business, Finance, Politics, Computer Sciences, Psychology, Laws, and Engineering. Teaching language is English. EUE has become an affiliate of the European University Association (EUA) in 2022.

Management / Governance

Chairman of the Board of Trustees: Mahmoud H. Abdel-Kader (former President of the German University in Cairo, GUC), 

Members of the Board of Trustees: Hossam M. Kamel (former President of Cairo University), Tamer Elkhorazaty (Dean of Architecture at GUC), Yasser Mansour (former Chairman of the Architecture Department at Ain Shams University) and others. 

Institutional and University Upper Management: Hilde Spahn-Langguth (former Director of Pharmacy at the IMPP Mainz) as 1st EUE President, Darrell D. Brooks as UCLan Branch President, Tarek M. Hashem as EUE Vice President.

References

External links 
 https://www.london.ac.uk/
 https://www.uclan.ac.uk/
 https://www.uclan.ac.uk/campuses/international-partners
 https://eue.edu.eg/
 https://www.impp.de/start.html

Universities in Egypt
Higher education